Stephanie Lou Haines (born 1969) is a United States district judge of the United States District Court for the Western District of Pennsylvania.

Education 

Haines received her Bachelor of Arts from Juniata College and her Juris Doctor from Ohio Northern University College of Law.

Legal career 

After graduating, she served as a law clerk for Judge Eugene E. Fike II of the Somerset County Court of Common Pleas. She then joined the U.S. Army and was a member of the United States Army Judge Advocate General's Corps, where she served as both a prosecutor and defense appellate specialist. She remains a reserve member of the United States Air Force Judge Advocate General's Corps.  She previously served as an Assistant United States Attorney in the U.S. Attorney's Office for the Southern District of West Virginia, as well as the U.S. Attorney's Office for the Western District of Pennsylvania. She was the sole prosecutor in the Johnstown, Pennsylvania, branch office and handles a wide variety of federal criminal matters.

Federal judicial service 

On March 1, 2019, President Donald Trump announced his intent to nominate Haines to serve as a United States district judge for the United States District Court for the Western District of Pennsylvania. On March 5, 2019, her nomination was sent to the Senate. President Trump nominated Haines to the seat vacated by Judge David S. Cercone, who assumed senior status on November 24, 2017. On April 10, 2019, a hearing on her nomination was held before the Senate Judiciary Committee. On May 9, 2019, her nomination was reported out of committee by a 21–1 vote. On July 30, 2019, the United States Senate invoked cloture on her nomination by a 87–1 vote. On September 11, 2019, her  nomination was confirmed by a 94–0 vote. She received her judicial commission on September 30, 2019.

References

External links 
 

1969 births
Living people
20th-century American lawyers
21st-century American lawyers
21st-century American judges
Assistant United States Attorneys
Claude W. Pettit College of Law alumni
United States Air Force Judge Advocate General's Corps
Judges of the United States District Court for the Western District of Pennsylvania
Juniata College alumni
Pennsylvania lawyers
People from Johnstown, Pennsylvania
United States district court judges appointed by Donald Trump
West Virginia lawyers
20th-century American women lawyers
21st-century American women lawyers
21st-century American women judges